Kim Dae-kwang (born 10 April 1992) is a South Korean footballer who is last known to have played as a midfielder for Goyang Citizen FC.

Career

Ad a youth player, Kim was nicknamed "the devil's talent" and joined the youth academy of German side 1. FC Nürnberg through a Korea Football Association program. Before the 2015 season, he signed for Ulsan Hyundai Mipo Dockyard in the South Korean third division. Before the 2016 season, Kim signed for South Korean second division club Bucheon FC 1995, where he made 3 appearances and 0 goals. On 1 June 2016, he debuted for Bucheon FC 1995 during a 0-0 draw with Chungnam Asan. Before the 2018 season, Kim signed for Changwon City in the South Korean third division. Before the 2020 season, he signed for South Korean fourth division team Goyang Citizen FC.

References

External links
 

South Korean footballers
Living people
Expatriate footballers in Germany
Association football midfielders
1992 births
Ulsan Hyundai Mipo Dockyard FC players
Bucheon FC 1995 players
Seoul E-Land FC players
Changwon City FC players